Dish of the Day may refer to:
 Dish of the Day (album), a studio album by the German pop group, Fools Garden
 plat du jour, the French expression